The 1992 NCAA Division III men's basketball tournament was the 18th annual single-elimination tournament to determine the national champions of National Collegiate Athletic Association (NCAA) men's Division III collegiate basketball in the United States.

The field featured forty teams, with the championship rounds again contested in Springfield, Ohio.

Calvin defeated Rochester, 62–49, to clinch their first NCAA Division III national title. The Knights (31–1) were coached by Ed Douma.

Wisconsin–Platteville, the defending champions, finished in third place.

Championship Rounds
Site: Springfield, Ohio

See also
1992 NCAA Division I men's basketball tournament
1992 NCAA Division II men's basketball tournament
1992 NAIA Division I men's basketball tournament
1992 NAIA Division II men's basketball tournament
1992 NCAA Division III women's basketball tournament

References

NCAA Division III men's basketball tournament
NCAA Men's Division III Basketball
Ncaa Tournament